Bargir Bakshi Balaji Rao was the 2nd Diwan of Mysore. He governed from April 1811 - January 1812. Bargir Bakshi Balaji Rao was the immediate successor of Purnaiya. Balaji Rao was succeeded by Savar Bakshi Rama Rao  in February 1812. Before being appointed as the Diwan, Bakshi Balaji Rao served as Karnik under Haidar Ali and Tipu Sultan at Devanahalli and Madhugiri and later was promoted as Bhakshi. He was also the shanubhog of Kysapura, Doddaganagavadi, Ibbalikehalli, Chowdaeshwarei Halli, Yerehalli, Arehalli, etc the surrounding villages of closepet. Later he became the Prime Minister of Mysore Kingdom.

References

Diwans of Mysore